Sun Over the Adriatic is a 1954 musical comedy film directed by Karl Georg Külb and starring Joachim Brennecke, Anneliese Kaplan and Carola Höhn. It was made as a co-production between West Germany and Yugoslavia.

Cast
 Joachim Brennecke as Charly
 Anneliese Kaplan as Dodo
 Carola Höhn as Frau Vogelsang
 Erika Remberg as Mira
 Heinz Lausch as Fred
 Pero Alexander as Ivo
 Klaus Havenstein as Bobby
 Ida Wüst as Beschlisserin
 Ludwig Schmidseder as Koch
 Kurt Großkurth as Ronic
 Fritz Lafontaine as Renard
 Hannes Keppler as Jack Dalton
 Jupp Hussels as Steward
 Hans Leibelt
 Ludwig Schürfeld
 René Carol as Singer
 Die Isaspatzen as Singers
 Sunshine Quartett as Singers
 H. Vojnovic as Mr. Barrow
 Ilse Wappler as Sängerin

References

Bibliography
 Michael Petzel & Marie Versini. Der Weg zum Silbersee: Dreharbeiten und Drehorte der Karl-May-Filme. Schwarzkopf und Schwarzkopf, 2001.

External links 
 

1954 films
1954 musical comedy films
German musical comedy films
West German films
Yugoslav musical comedy films
1950s German-language films
Films directed by Karl Georg Külb
Films with screenplays by Karl Georg Külb
Yugoslav black-and-white films
German black-and-white films
1950s German films